(born March 19, 2001) is a Japanese racehorse trained by Katsuhiko Sumii. Pop Rock is best known for having placed second in the 2006 Melbourne Cup, ridden by Damien Oliver. By the time the race was run, Pop Rock had effectively become joint favourite. It was Oliver's 17th time racing in the Melbourne Cup.

On his next start, it managed to get the closest to Deep Impact in the 2006 Group 1 Arima Kinen and was beaten to second by Admire Moon in the 2007 Japan Cup.

In 2010 Pop Rock was sold to new owners and was trained in Ireland by Takashi Kodama. It won on his European debut at Galway Racecourse in July 2010. Its final race was the Irish St. Leger but it trailed the field and was then retired to stud.

Finishes
Wins
2006 and 2007 Meguro Kinen (Domestic GII), Tokyo Turf 2500m

Second
 2006 Melbourne Cup (G1), Flemington Turf 3200m
 2006 Arima Kinen (Grand Prix) (Domestic G1), Nakayama Turf 2500m
 2007 Japan Cup (G1), Tokyo Turf 2400m

Pedigree

See also
 List of millionaire racehorses in Australia

References

2001 racehorse births
Thoroughbred family 7-c
Racehorses bred in Japan
Racehorses trained in Japan